Sonam Tobgay (born 25 March 1990) is a Bhutanese sportsman who has represented his country in both, cricket and football.

On 7 December 2019, he became the first batsman to be retired out in a T20I.

Career
His international tournaments for the Bhutan include the 2006 ACC Trophy, the 2009 ACC Trophy Challenge, the 2010 ACC Trophy Elite, the 2010 ICC World Cricket League Division Eight, the 2011 ACC Twenty20 Cup, the 2012 ICC World Cricket League Division Eight, the 2012 ACC Trophy Elite, the 2014 ACC Elite League, and the 2017 ICC World Cricket League Asia Region Division One. He scored 55 runs against Saudi Arabia in the 2014 ACC Elite League, though his team still lost by 300 runs.

Tobgay made his first appearance for the Bhutan national football team in their final 2018 FIFA World Cup qualifying match against the Maldives, coming on as a substitute in the 76th minute. He has played in six international football matches for Bhutan to date.

He made his Twenty20 International (T20I) debut for Bhutan in the 2019 South Asian Games against Nepal on 5 December 2019.

During a group stage match against Maldives during the 2019 South Asian Games, he tactically retired out at the end of the 19th over of the Bhutanese innings after scoring 24 off 35 balls as he was struggling for timing throughout the innings. It became the first instance where a batsman retired out in a T20I match although the match happened to be part of a multi-sport event rather than an ICC event or a bilateral series. The T20 cricket tournament at the 2019 South Asian Games was given official international status by the ICC which confirmed that the retired out incident which took place during the tournament between Bhutan and Maldives was deemed as first ever instance to happen in T20I cricket.

References

Bhutanese footballers
Bhutan international footballers
Living people
Association football forwards
Bhutanese cricketers
1990 births
Bhutan Twenty20 International cricketers